Murley is a surname. Notable people with the surname include:

Matt Murley (born 1979), American ice hockey player
Mike Murley (born 1961), Canadian jazz saxophonist and composer
Reginald Murley (1916–1997), British surgeon
Robert S. Murley, American businessman and philanthropist